Gold Bridge is an unincorporated community in the Bridge River Country of British Columbia, Canada. Although numbering only around 40 inhabitants, Gold Bridge is the service and supply centre for the upper basin of the Bridge River Valley, which includes recreation-residential areas at the Gun Lakes, Tyaughton Lake, Marshall Creek, and Bralorne; and the nearby ghost towns of Brexton and Pioneer Mine.

Located at the confluence of the Bridge River with its south fork, the Hurley River, Gold Bridge began as a freewheeling merchandising and services center supplementary to the company-run gold mining towns, and in its heyday had a large commercial roster ranging from insurance and stockbrokers through to bootleggers and "sporting houses".

Gold Bridge can be accessed via Highway 40 from Lillooet, or via an upgraded backroad from Pemberton and Whistler known as the Hurley Main, which uses a pass at the head of the Hurley River to access the valley of the upper Lillooet River north of Pemberton.

Climate and terrain
Gold Bridge enjoys relatively dry, sunny, and snowy winters (up to 3 feet) and fairly hot, dry summers in an almost semi-arid subalpine Pine Forest environment. Its 610 m+ altitude is compensated by open exposure in the broad basin of the upper Bridge River.

Tourism and recreation
Nearby Gun Lake, three kilometers away, has been a recreation retreat since the glory days of the Bridge River mines in the 1930s. Nearby Little Gun Lake is home to a private lodge of the same name, built by promoters of the Bralorne Mine to house dignitaries visiting the valley, which at times has operated as a boutique hotel (but not currently). Both Gun Lakes are renowned for fishing, as are Tyaughton (Tyax) and Marshall Lakes and the famous Spruce Lake, which is one of the most accessible and some say the most beautiful part of the controversial Southern Chilcotin provincial park, which lies immediately north of Gold Bridge beyond Gun Creek, north of Gun Lake. The Downton Lake and Carpenter Lake reservoirs are not suitable for general recreation, other than campsites and power boating, and they have been stocked, but the best fishing in all areas is at the many smaller lakes in the Bridge River basin - Gold Bridge being no more than 40 minutes to or from anywhere within the Bridge River basin, from Marshall Lake on up. Hunting is fairly active in certain areas at different times of the year, so hikers and other unarmed recreationists should consult game, recreation or forestry offices in Pemberton or Lillooet, or come equipped with a hunting guide for reference.

The biggest tourism attraction near Gold Bridge, other than the area's diverse scenery and many alpine-setting lakes, is the vintage 1930s gold mining ghost town of Bralorne-Pioneer Mine, about 10 km south-southeast up Cadwallader Creek, beyond the 5 km canyon of the Hurley River. At one time not only the largest town in the regional district and one of the few places in British Columbia to prosper during the Great Depression of the 1930s, Bralorne was also the richest gold mine in Canada's history, and had the third-deepest shaft in the world. Often proposed for a ski area, proposals to develop Bralorne have always failed for the government's ongoing refusal to pave the Hurley Main route from Gold Bridge to Pemberton, currently a backroad, to open up Gold Bridge, Bralorne and the Bridge River lakes and its new provincial park to the Coast via Whistler, British Columbia and Greater Vancouver.

Hiking, mountain biking, 4x4'ing and backcountry exploration and camping of all kinds are excellent throughout the region surrounding Gold Bridge. The Southern Chilcotin Mountains Provincial Park has been famous for its unusual semiarid alpine scenery and rich wildlife for over a hundred years, while the Bendor Range, which Gold Bridge is at the foot of, is a favourite with alpinists and outdoor expeditionists. A trail connects via a tributary of Cadwallader Creek to McGillivray Pass, which connects into the deep valley of Anderson Lake near D'Arcy, but this route like the Hurley has never been developed though proposed both for a highway and a cog railway connecting to the PGE line at the foot of the pass. The cluster of ranges between that pass and Pemberton, 77 km southwest, is also easily accessible from Gold Bridge and popular with hikers, although access from the Gold Bridge side is not yet promoted.

Gold Bridge school has an attendance (2015-2016) of 5, and is the only school in the Bridge River Valley.

References
The Great Years, Lewis Green, Tricouni Books Vancouver 2001
Bridge River Gold, Emma de Hullu and others, self-published, 1971, out of print.

External links
Bridge River Valley Chamber of Commerce
Aerial view of Gold Bridge from Randall & Kat's Flying Photos

Designated places in British Columbia
Unincorporated settlements in British Columbia
Bridge River Country
Mining communities in British Columbia
Ghost towns in British Columbia
Populated places in the Squamish-Lillooet Regional District